Field bean is a general term for several plants found growing within fields or shrubbery and may refer to:

Lablab purpureus (the hyacinth bean)
Phaseolus vulgaris (the string bean)
Vicia faba (the broad bean)